ISCO (イスコ), short for "Intelligent System Corporation" was a video game developer company, with many of its games subcontracted down to other developers.

Games developed

Arcade 
 ピザストーリー (year unknown; genre ETC)

Genesis 

 Midnight Resistance (for Data East; subcontracted to Opera House; 1990)
 Verytex (for Asmik; subcontracted to Opera House; 1991)
 Two Crude Dudes (for Data East; subcontracted to Opera House; 1991)
 Master of Monsters (for Toshiba EMI; subcontracted to Opera House; 1991)
 Captain America and the Avengers (for Data East; subcontracted to Opera House; 1992)

Game Gear 

 Side Pocket (for Data East; subcontracted to Opera House; 1994)

Saturn 

 マイ・ベスト・フレンズ (My Best Friends: St. Andrew Jogakuin Hen (for Atlus; 1996)?)
 Game-Ware 3 Gou (ピピットボーイの大冒険３) (for General Entertainment; 1996)
 AI Igo (for ASCII Something Good; 1997)
 Game-Ware 4 Gou (窓拭き職人ゴンドラ君) (for General Entertainment; 1997)
 GW４（ピピットボーイの大冒険４） (page says Game-Ware 4 Gou, picture shows Game-Ware 5 Gou)
 Deep Fear ("ムービー" (video production?) and PAL conversion) (for Sega; 1998)

TurboGrafx-16
 Drop Off (for Data East; subcontracted to Cream; 1990)

Windows, Unknown Publisher 

 映画監督物語 (simulation game) (KSS?)
 お父さんのための競馬２ (simulation game)
 お父さんのための競馬 (simulation game)

References

Video game companies of Japan